The Haring-Corning House is a historic house in Rockleigh, Bergen County, New Jersey, United States. The house was built in 1741 and was added to the National Register of Historic Places on August 8, 1985.

History
The original section of the house was built in 1741 by Abraham D. Haring. A large Dutch Colonial style addition was added to the house in 1828. Samuel B. Corning purchased the house in 1856. The businessman Jenkins Sloat purchased the house in 1870 and operated a sawmill on the property.

William L. Tait, the first mayor of Rockleigh, owned the house from 1913 to 1930. Tait added a wing to the house, a veranda and extended the central dormer. The Rose Haven School for girls used the house as living space from 1930 to 1983.

See also
National Register of Historic Places listings in Bergen County, New Jersey

References

Houses on the National Register of Historic Places in New Jersey
Houses completed in 1741
Houses in Bergen County, New Jersey
National Register of Historic Places in Bergen County, New Jersey
Rockleigh, New Jersey
New Jersey Register of Historic Places